Frederick B. Lindstrom (June 8, 1915 – January 8, 1998) was an American sociologist specializing in popular culture and demography who spent over four decades, starting in 1953, as professor (later professor emeritus) of sociology at Arizona State University.

A Massachusetts native, Lindstrom was born in the town of Palmer, located within the Springfield metropolitan area. His family background was mixed, including Swedish, German-Jewish, and other European forebears; he received a secular upbringing.  He attended the University of Chicago, receiving his A.B. in 1938 and A.M. in 1941. Following service in World War II, he returned to the University on the G.I. Bill, earning his Ph.D. in 1950. After teaching for three years at the University of Massachusetts Amherst, he relocated to Arizona, where he chaired the ASU Department of Sociology for a record number of years. He also served multiple terms as Secretary-Treasurer of the Pacific Sociological Association (PSA). Lindstrom was considered to incarnate the outlook and practices of the Chicago school, of which he was a historian, contributing to the special issue of the journal Sociological Perspectives (Vol. 31, No. 3, July 1988) entitled Waving the Flag for Old Chicago. With his wife, Laura Johnson, and Ronald A. Hardert, he edited the 1995 book Kimball Young on Sociology in Transition, 1912–1968. As a student of popular culture, he maintained an extensive collection of jazz and blues records, ranging from 78s to CDs, and frequently offered a course entitled The Sociology of Jazz and Blues. His official area of specialization, however, was demography. Before serving in the war, he had specialized in literature—after his change of academic field, he was involved with sociology of the arts and the teaching of sociology through literature. In 1994 he received a distinguished service award from ASU's College of Liberal Arts.

Frederick B. Lindstrom died at the age of 82. He and his wife Laura were the parents of three children—two sons and daughter Naomi, a literary critic specializing in Latin America, with whom he co-authored conference papers and articles.

External links
 Frederick B. Lindstrom in memoriam notice (April 1998 issue of the University of Chicago Magazine)

American sociologists
American demographers
University of Chicago alumni
Arizona State University faculty
American agnostics
Collectors
People from Tempe, Arizona
American people of Swedish descent
American people of German-Jewish descent
People from Palmer, Massachusetts
1915 births
1998 deaths
Place of death missing